Joy and Tom Studios, Inc. produces hand sculpted prototypes for the pre-painted statues and collectibles industry. The company, located in Sanford, Florida, was founded in 1983 by Joy and Tom Snyder. Their portfolio of work consists of many statues, busts, and portraits based on licensed properties from companies such as Disney, Warner Brothers, Marvel Comics, DC Comics, and others. In addition to their work in the collectibles industry, they have produced many sculpted and painted likenesses that have appeared on the stop-motion animated program Robot Chicken on Cartoon Network's Adult Swim.

History
Joy and Tom Snyder met while attending art school at Ringling College of Art and Design in Sarasota, Florida where they both majored in fine art. After graduating from art school in 1983, they married on June 4 of the same year and later formed Joy and Tom Studios, where they would provide artistic services in a number of different fields, including family portraiture and graphic design. In the early 1990s they were approached about sculpting their first resin garage kit which marked the beginning of long, diverse sculpting careers for the artists.

Services
Joy and Tom Studios' sculpted works range in scale from 6" action figures to life size statues. They work in several forms of sculpting media, including Super-Sculpey, Apoxy-Sculpt, Castilene, wax, fiberglass, and Styrofoam. Their prototyping work also includes molding, build-up, and paint-mastering services.

Statues and Collectibles
During the mid-to-late 1990s, Joy and Tom continued to do freelance sculpting work in the garage kit industry through their studio. These projects eventually led to their company obtaining sculpting work on prototypes for licensed statues and collectibles from several notable companies that produce licensed collectibles.

Below is a partial list of some of Joy and Tom Studios' clients:

Licensed Work
Since beginning to work in the collectibles industry, Joy and Tom Studios have had their services utilized for a number of projects involving notable licenses from comics, television, and film. For many projects, Joy and Tom work directly with the owner of the license throughout the sculpting process to assure that the finished product meets their exact specifications. Below is a partial list of some of the many licenses Joy and Tom Studios have worked with:

2D Translation
Many of the collectibles that Joy and Tom Studios sculpt involve translating the work of notable comic book artists and illustrators into 3-dimensional statues. In many instances the original artist provides art direction as the statues are being made and is responsible for giving their final approval upon completion of the project.

Below is a partial list of some of the many 2D artists whose work has been translated into statues and busts by Joy and Tom Studios:

Likeness Sculpting
Much of the sculpting done by Joy and Tom Studios that is not based on comic book properties involves sculpting likenesses of notable actors, musicians, and public figures. The company has sculpted approximately 1,000 different portraits of famous individuals including more than 300 different likenesses that have appeared on the stop-motion animated program Robot Chicken.

Of the many likenesses sculpted by Joy and Tom Studios, some of the notable public figures their work has been based on are listed below:

Lifesize Sculpture
In addition to collectibles, Joy and Tom Studios has also done sculpting work on many life-size statues. From 1995-96 Joy and Tom worked full-time at Walt Disney World, designing and sculpting various life-size statues and props of Disney characters for display in the theme parks and stores, including a life-size Goofy statue sitting on a bench on permanent display just inside the front gate of the Magic Kingdom. Following their tenure at Disney, Joy and Tom continued to work for Disney on a freelance basis through their company.

In addition to their projects for Disney, other notable life-sized projects include Droid Starfighters from the Star Wars films that were displayed in F.A.O. Schwartz in New York City, a replica of the Batboat from the film Batman Forever used in a water-based stunt show at Six Flags over Texas, and the Emperor's throne for the set of the Mortal Kombat TV series.

Awards and recognition
The sculpted works of Joy and Tom Studios have been honored by inclusion in the Spectrum Annual publication and the company has been recognized multiple times for their work by Wizard Magazine and ToyFare Magazine on various "Top 5 Statue and Busts" lists including the "Statue of the Year" award from ToyFare in 2005 for their Ultimate Spider-Man vs. Dr. Octopus for Dynamic Forces.

References

External links
 Joy and Tom Studios' Official Website

American sculptors
American companies established in 1983
1983 establishments in Florida
Companies based in Seminole County, Florida
Sanford, Florida